The debate on Korean mixed script hanja honyong (Korean: 한자혼용; Hanja: 漢字混用) and Hangŭl exclusivity hangŭl jŏnyong (Korean: 한글전용; Hanja: 한글專用/韓글專用) is an ongoing debate concerning the use of Chinese characters, known as Hanja (漢字), in Korean orthography. It is a hotly contested topic to this day in Korea and garners the attention of many as it is an issue which concerns education from its earliest years to university. The debate itself is a question as to whether Korean should be written with Hanja mixed into the text, or purely in Hangŭl (e.g. 大韓民國을~ vs. 대한민국을~). The debate also oftentimes centres around the education of Hanja in schools, the effects of which are also debated. It is a controversial debate which concerns the orthography, vocabulary, and other aspects of the written language.

History of Mixed Script 
The foremost problem at the centre of this debate is the use of Hanja. Mixed script was a commonly used means of writing, although Hangŭl exclusive writing has been used concurrently, in Korea after the decline of literary Chinese, known as hanmun (Korean: 한문; Hanja: 漢文). Mixed script could be commonly found in non-fiction writing, news papers, etc. until the enacting of Park Chung-hee's 5 Year Plan for Hangŭl Exclusivity hangŭl jŏnyong ogaenyŏn gyehuik an (Korean: 한글전용 5개년 계획안; Hanja: 한글專用 5個年 計劃案) in 1968 banned the use and teaching of Hanja in public schools, as well as forbade its use in the military, with the goal of completely eliminating Hanja in writing by 1972 through legislative and executive means. However, due to public backlash, in 1972 Park's government allowed for the teaching of Hanja in special classes but maintained a ban on Hanja use in textbooks and other learning materials outside of the classes. This reverse step however, was optional so the availability of Hanja education was dependent on the school one went to. Park's Hanja ban was not formally lifted until 1992 under the government of Kim Young-Sam. In 1999 the government of Kim Dae-Jung actively promoted Hanja by placing it on signs on the road, at bus stops, and in subways. In 1999 Han Mun was reintroduced as a school elective and in 2001 the Hanja Proficiency Test hanja nŭngryŏk gŏmjŏng sihŏm (Korean: 한자능력검정시험; Hanja: 漢字能力檢定試驗) was introduced. In 2005 an older law, the Law Concerning Hangul Exclusivity hangŭl jŏnyonge gwahak pŏmnyul (Korean: 한글전용에 관한 법률; Hanja: 한글專用에 關한 法律) was repealed as well. In 2013 all elementary schools in Seoul started teaching Hanja. However, the result is that Koreans who were educated in this period having never been formally educated in Hanja are unable to use them and thus the use of Hanja has plummeted in orthography until the modern day. Where Hanja is now very rarely used and is almost only used for abbreviations in newspaper headlines (e.g. 中 for China, 韓 for Korea, 美 for the United States, 日 for Japan, etc.), for clarification in text where a word might be confused for another due to homophones (e.g. 이사장(李 社長) vs. 이사장(理事長)), or for stylistic use such as the 辛 (Korean: 신라면; Hanja: 辛拉麵) used on Shin Ramyŏn packaging.

Information Theory 
Proponents of the use of mixed script of cite information theory as an argument against Hangŭl exclusivity. The premise being that Hangŭl has a much lower amount of information in comparison to Hanja. Hangŭl has 24 letters: 14 consonants; ㄱ ㄲ ㄴ ㄷ ㄸ ㄹ ㅁ ㅂ ㅃ ㅅ ㅆ ㅇ ㅈ ㅉ ㅊ ㅋ ㅌ ㅍ ㅎ, and 10 vowels;ㅏ ㅐ ㅑ ㅒ ㅓ ㅔ ㅕ ㅖ ㅗ ㅘ ㅙ ㅚ ㅛ ㅜ ㅝ ㅞ ㅟ ㅠ ㅡ ㅢ ㅣ. Whereas Hanja are logograms consisting of over 80,000 characters, around 2,000 of which are considered "common use" in Korea. Thus if you assume Hangŭl occurs with equal probability and is independent (which is not true as the actual probability for Hangul ranges from 0.122 for ㅇ and 0.002 for ㅋ), each Hangŭl letter occurs 1/24 of the time whilst each Hanja occurs 1/2,000 of the time. Thus, the entropy of Hangul is only 4.75 bits-per-symbol, while the entropy of Hanja is 10.96 bits-per-symbol (and 15.29 bits-per-symbol, when 40,000 symbols are considered). This means that each character of Hanja conveys much more information than each letter of Hangŭl. This data is of course not entirely correct, and in actuality certain symbols do occur with more frequency than others, and therefore the entropy will be much lower. However, this does not detract from the finding that each character of Hanja conveys more information than each letter of Hangul as there are still many more Hanja characters than Hangul letters. The fact that Hanja conveys more information than Hangul has ramifications in the semantic meaning of each character. Using the word "일" as an example, composed of the Hangŭl letters ㅇ, ㅣ, and ㄹ. In only three letters there is much ambiguity this could mean 一(일) one, 業(일) work, 日(일) day, or even be a grammatical particle. As shown, writing the Hanja makes it clear and obvious which "일" you mean. To take the example further you can compare Hanja to their Hangŭl pronunciation and corresponding native word, or eumhun (Korean: 음훈; Hanja: 音訓). See below:

 車 (1 character) → Hanja: 차 (2 letters) car
 天 (1 character) → Hanja: 천 (3 letters), Native: 하늘 (5 letters) sky
 止 (1 character) → Hanja: 지 (2 letters), Native: 멈추다 (7 letters) to stop
 褰 (1 character) → Hanja: 건 (3 letters), Native: 옷을걷어올리다 (18 letters) to hang up clothes
 蔭 (1 character) → Hanja: 음 (3 letters), Native: 조상의 공덕에 의하여 맡은 벼슬 (33 letters) A bureaucratic position attained based on merits of an ancestor

Many times Hangŭl may appear more compact simply due to its nature of being stacked into syllable blocks. Based on the actual brevity and amount of information conveyed from an information theory perspective, Hanja is a superior means over Hangŭl. And a mixed script orthography with an optimal distribution of probability between Hanja and Hangŭl would increase the information content of writing, shortening the amount of symbols needed to convey the same meaning while maintaining ease of learning.

Literacy

Hangŭl Exclusivity 

 Proponents of Hangŭl exclusive policies commonly cite literacy rates and refer to them as a display of Hangŭl's success. Using Hangŭl exclusively drastically simplifies the language down to the use of the 24 aforementioned letters of the alphabet and allows for everyone to read.
 Furthermore, before the introduction of Hangŭl most outside of the elite class were illiterate. Hangŭl allowed for these people to learn to read and write in their language. Hangŭl also saves students time because they don't have to learn complex Hanja to be able to read.

Mixed Script 

 The literacy rates of a nation in the modern day are not dependent on its script, but rather its access to education. For the first 500 years of Hangŭl's existence Korea's literacy rates were not higher than that of other pre-industrialised states or even that of its character-using neighbours.
 Countries that also use alphabetic scripts but have more letters have higher literacy rates. Russia's Cyrillic alphabet has 66 letters (upper and lower case) and has a higher literacy rate than that of South Korea
 Korea's immediate neighbours China, Japan, and Taiwan, all users of characters have higher or near equal (in the case of China, however this can still be appreciated due to its vast size) literacy rates.
 Another argument commonly made by mixed script advocates is that of functional literacy. Functional illiteracy concerns with reading skills above the basic level necessary to manage daily life and employment. It is different from pure illiteracy, the measure discussed above, which is the inability to read at all. The two are not unrelated: if one is purely illiterate, then they are also functionally illiterate. One criticism of functional illiteracy is that the measure is not uniform. The Organisation for Economic Co-operation and Development (OECD) has been measuring functional illiteracy among member states, which are most developed countries including South Korea. In a 2005 study, South Korean adults had the highest rate of functional illiteracy out of 22 OECD member states surveyed with a rate of 38%, much higher than the average of 22%. Almost three in four Korean adults had difficulty reading information necessary for their occupation or skill. Some Korean education experts, including those in favor of Hangul-Hanja mixed script, have attributed the high rate of functional illiteracy to the lack of Hanja education in Korean public education system. This claim is somewhat substantiated by the fact that 60-70% of the Korean vocabulary is derived from Hanja, many of which appear more often in technical fields. Another Korean poll reports that 58% of college-aged Koreans, most of whom have never been taught Hanja, have felt inconvenienced by their lack of knowledge of Hanja at some point in their lives.

Vocabulary

Hangŭl Exclusivity 

 Due to the homophonic nature of Sino-Korean vocabulary much ambiguity is introduced into writing as shown in the "Information Theory" section. To combat this many Hangŭl exclusivity proponents support adopting more obscure native words for things which would be homophonic, or creating new words to disambiguate and purify the language. Along with this proponents claim that Hangŭl exclusivity has made the language both more understandable and easier to comprehend.
 Sino-Korean vocabulary derives from Chinese and are foreign loanwords.

Mixed Script 

 It is estimated that up to 60% of the Korean vocabulary is composed of Sino-Korean words; according to these estimates, native Korean words form a minority (i.e. less than half) of the vocabulary in the spoken Korean language.
 Many Korean speakers cannot tell apart Sino-Korean words from “pure” Korean words, many Sino-Korean words are of Korean coinage, and many so-called “pure” Korean words were originally Sino-Korean words.
 There is a large quantity of Sino-Korean words that are unique/exclusive to Korean or differ drastically in usage in comparison to Chinese or Japanese.
 In addition to Sino-Korean words only used in Korean, many native Korean words are suggested to have originated from Sino-Korean words themselves, whose pronunciations have since deviated from their Hanja pronunciation. For instance, the word kimchi (Korean: 김치) from (Korean: 침채; Hanja: 沈菜) has its origins in a Hanja word.
 The use of Hanja allows for the communication of complex terms that can be easily understood. For example: 人工智能(인공지능), defined as artificial intelligence, literally person('s) work (not natural, i.e. artificial) knowing ability (ability to know, i.e. intelligence).
 Attempting to completely replace Hanja with native words has been done before; these attempts have ultimately returned to the use of Sino-Korean vocabulary.

Politics

Hangŭl Exclusivity 

 An argument made against mixed script by supporters of Hangŭl exclusivity is that mixed script is an invention made by the Japanese, due to the two script's similarity, and was forced upon the Korean people during the Japanese occupation of Korea during World War II. This is used as a call to action against Hanja as, if true, it would be a legacy of the Japanese colonial past and an embarrassment on the part of Korea for upholding Japan's legacy of oppression upon the peninsula. This however, is not true. Korean mixed script predates Japanese colonialism by some time, see below.

Mixed Script 

 The concept of a "mixed script" predates Hangŭl in the forms of Idu, Kugyŏl, and Hyangchal. These were used to transcribe Korean grammatical particles to aid in reading in Classical Chinese texts. Both of these scripts were "mixed scripts". Idu used either the pronunciation or the Korean native reading of the character to transcribe the grammatical particles. While kugyŏl used specialised marking characters based on simplifications of Hanja for the same purpose.
 Mixed script has been in continual use since the introduction of Hangŭl. The Songs of Dragons Flying to Heaven (Korean: 용비어천가; Hanja: 龍飛御天歌), Sŏkbosangjŏl (Korean: 석보상절; Hanja: 釋譜祥節), Wŏl’insŏkbo (Korean: 월인석보; Hanja: 月印釋譜), and A Vernacular Translation of the Lotus Sutra (Korean: 법경화언해; Hanja: 法華經諺解), are all pioneering Hangŭl works written in Korean mixed script.
 A further point mixed script advocates sometimes point out is that Hangŭl itself was standardised under the Japanese colonial administration by Japanese collaborators who sought to make propaganda that could be consumed by all Koreans.
 Furthermore, mixed script proponents use is the fact that Hangŭl exclusivity has been enacted under dictators. In South Korea, Hangŭl exclusivity was brought on by the government of Park Chung-Hee who came to power from a military coup d'état. Similarly, in the Democratic People's Republic of Korea, Hangŭl exclusivity was brought about by Kim Il-Sung after taking power in 1949.

References 

Korean writing system
Chinese characters
Hanja